Sergei Nikolayevich Barkalov (born 1 March 1973) is a Russian professional football coach and a former player. He works as a goalkeepers coach with FC Zenit Irkutsk.

External links
 

1973 births
Footballers from Voronezh
Living people
Soviet footballers
Russian footballers
Association football goalkeepers
FC Kremin Kremenchuk players
FC Sodovik Sterlitamak players
FC Ataka Minsk players
FC Zvezda Irkutsk players
FC Baikal Irkutsk players
Ukrainian Premier League players
Ukrainian First League players
Belarusian Premier League players
Russian expatriate footballers
Expatriate footballers in Ukraine
Expatriate footballers in Belarus
FC Volga Ulyanovsk players